John H. Deuster (ca. 1811September 27, 1882) was a German American immigrant and merchant who served a single one-year term in 1866 as a Democratic member of the Wisconsin State Assembly from southern Milwaukee County.

He was born in the Kingdom of Prussia. At the January 1866 commencement of the 19th Wisconsin Legislature, he was 54 years old and had been in Wisconsin for 21 years. He listed his profession as "merchant".

He was elected in 1865 for a one-year term from the 9th Milwaukee County district (the Towns of Franklin, Lake, and Oak Creek) succeeding fellow Democrat Richard White. He was assigned to the standing committee on roads, bridges and ferries. He was succeeded the next year by fellow Democrat Valentin Knœll.

There is no source to indicate whether he was related to Peter V. Deuster or Joseph Deuster, although they were all three born in Prussia, moved to Milwaukee, and became active Democratic Party politicians and legislators.

References 

Wisconsin Democrats
Businesspeople from Wisconsin
People from the Kingdom of Prussia
Prussian emigrants to the United States
1882 deaths